Les Grandes Otanes is a mountain of the Mont Blanc Massif, located on the border between Switzerland and France, north of the Aiguille du Tour. They overlook the Col de Balme.

References

External links
 Les Grandes Otanes on Hikr

Mountains of the Alps
Mountains of Valais
Mountains of Haute-Savoie
International mountains of Europe
France–Switzerland border
Mountains of Switzerland
Two-thousanders of Switzerland